Eduardo Francisco de Silva Neto (born 2 February 1980 in Brazil), also known as Dudu, is a Brazilian former professional footballer who played as a forward.

In 2008, he won South Korea's K-League top scorer with 15 goals.

Honours

Individual
 K-League Top Scorer : 2008

Seongnam Ilhwa
 K-League: 2006

References

External links

 

1980 births
Living people
Association football forwards
Brazilian footballers
Brazilian expatriate footballers
Esporte Clube Vitória players
Guarani FC players
Kalmar FF players
America Football Club (RJ) players
Cruzeiro Esporte Clube players
Seongnam FC players
FC Seoul players
Allsvenskan players
Omiya Ardija players
Botafogo Futebol Clube (SP) players
Figueirense FC players
Duque de Caxias Futebol Clube players
K League 1 players
J1 League players
Expatriate footballers in Sweden
Expatriate footballers in South Korea
Footballers from Rio de Janeiro (city)
Brazilian expatriate sportspeople in Sweden
Brazilian expatriate sportspeople in South Korea
Expatriate footballers in Japan